Westmorland (sometimes spelled Westmoreland) in North West England was abolished in 1974 following Ted Heath's Local Government Act 1972. Westmorland became a part of Cumbria along with Cumberland, parts of Yorkshire and Lancashire, including the Furness peninsular. In 2022 Westmorland was reconstituted as Westmorland and Furness following the abolition of Cumbria County Council. Westmorland and Furness have no High Sheriff as Cumbria has remained the ceremonial county.

The traditional county of Westmorland, like neighbouring Lancashire, was itself a new creation during the Middle Ages. It seems to have been treated as part of Yorkshire in the 11th century, and the eventual boundaries represented a merger between an earlier entity called Westmorland, and the Barony of Kendal, which was apparently originally considered part of the Honor of Lancaster, though it did not become part of Lancashire. Kendal is also now part of Cumbria.

The original Westmorland is sometimes referred to as Westmarieland and is later referred to as the Barony of Appleby or "Northern Westmorland".

List of sheriffs

The following is an incomplete list of historical sheriffs.

Except where separately referenced, names are taken from the website of the Public Record Office in Kew. The references given are also used throughout English archives.

Between the thirteenth century and 1849, the office of sheriff was hereditary, firstly granted  in perpetuity by King John to Robert de Veteripont and afterwards held by the de Clifford family and then by the Earls of Thanet, until the 11th earl died with no successors. Due to the continued absence of the earlier incumbents on military service the duties would be actually be undertaken by a trusted deputy sheriff.

The office was finally abolished in 1974 when the shrievalty of Cumbria was established.

1129. Richard filius Gerardi de Appleby.
1174. Ranulf de Glanville
1176. Ranulf de Glanville
1177. Ranulf de Glanville
c. 1189. Osbert de Longo Campo (Longchamp) D MUS 2/10/24
1191–1199 Hugh Bardulf
1199. Geoffrey FitzPeter
1200. William de Stuteville. D MUS 2/10/67.
1201. Geoffrey FitzPeter  and Roger Bellocampo [Beauchamp] (under-sheriff?)(cf. The History and Antiquities of the Counties of Westmoreland and Cumberland. Vol. I)
1202. William Stutevil and Philip Escrope (under-sheriff?)
1204–1228 Robert de Veteripont (Vipont)
1230 William de Ireby
1235 John de Vieuxpont Vipont (Hereditary Sheriff 1228–1243)
c. 1230. Alexander Bachucton D/WYB/2/115
1241 Gilbert of Kirketon DDHV/70/1
1241–43 John de Veteriponte(Hereditary Sheriff 1228–1243)
Robert de Vieuxpont (Hereditary Sheriff 1243–1242)
John de Vieuxpont (Hereditary Sheriff 1242–1264)
Isobella and Idomea Vieuxpont (Hereditary Sheriffs 1264-1308?)
mid 13th century. Roger de Stokes D/WYB/2/35
before 1283 Thomas de Mussegrave D/WYB/2/38
c. 1280–1290 William de Steynton D MUS 2/10/88
c. 1283–1289 Sir Richard de Medburn D/WYB/2/42
1284 Michael de Hartcla D/WYB/2/116
1288 Robert de Morvill D/WYB/2/43
1294 Thomas de Hellebek WD D/MD 40
1312 1312 Robert de Morwyll D HC 2/11/6
1317 Henry de Warthecopp D/WYB/2/117
1320–1322 Hugh de Louther SC 8/151/7531 (Louther also served as sheriff from October 1320 to February 1322)
1322–1323 Hugh de Louther SC 8/151/7531 (Louther did hold the office from December 1322 to July 1323, and it is possible that this short term was as a result of the complaints made in this petition (List of Sheriffs, p. 150). However Louther also served as sheriff from October 1320 to February 1322)
c. 1323–1325 Henry de Threlkeld C 49/45/14
1329 Thomas de Waryekop D/WYB/2/123
1330 Nicholas de Grendon SC 8/33/1650
1333–1334? Robert de Sandford D MUS 2/10/32
1342 Thomas de Musgrave D/WYB/2/124
Robert de Clifford, 1st Baron Clifford (Hereditary Sheriff 1308?–1314 (killed))
Roger de Clifford, 2nd Baron Clifford (Hereditary Sheriff 1314–1322 (hanged and attainted 1322))
Robert de Clifford, 3rd Baron Clifford (Attainder revoked 1327. Hereditary Sheriff 1327–1344)
1344 Robert de Clifford, 4th Baron Clifford (Hereditary Sheriff 1344–1344)
1351 John de Burgham
1355 Hugh de la Boure C 131/9/17
c. 1360 Roger Clifford, 5th Baron de Clifford (Hereditary Sheriff 1350–1389) SC 8/130/6466
Thomas Clifford, 6th Baron de Clifford (Hereditary Sheriff 1389–1391)
John Clifford, 7th Baron de Clifford (Hereditary Sheriff 1391–1422) (killed 1422)
1380 William de Lancaster WD RY/BOX 92/53
1389 Walter de Stirkeland SC 8/222/11077
1402 Elizabeth Clifford SC 8/119/5945
1403–1406 Thomas Warcop  SC 8/23/1108 (Thomas Warcop of Lambert's Ash was sheriff between November 1403 and October/November 1406, and again (unless this is the son?) between September/October 1417 and October 1418)
1406–1408 William de Thornburgh SC 8/23/1108 (sheriff between October/November 1406 and October/November 1408)
1417–1418 Thomas Warcop  SC 8/23/1108 (Thomas Warcop of Lambert's Ash was sheriff between November 1403 and October/November 1406, and again (unless this is the son?) between September/October 1417 and October 1418)
Thomas Clifford, 8th Baron de Clifford (Hereditary Sheriff 1422–1455) (killed 1455)
John Clifford, 9th Baron de Clifford (Hereditary sheriff 1455–1461, attainted  1461)
1462–1473 Sir John Parr
1484–1485 Sir Richard Ratcliff Awarded for life but killed 1485.
1512 Henry Clifford C 131/97/16 (attainder revoked 1485, Hereditary sheriff 1485–1523)
Henry Clifford, 1st Earl of Cumberland (Hereditary sheriff 1523–1542)
Henry Clifford, 2nd Earl of Cumberland (Hereditary sheriff 1542–1570)
George Clifford, 3rd Earl of Cumberland (Hereditary sheriff 1570–1605)
1643–1676 Lady Anne Clifford (Hereditary sheriff 1606–1676)
1676–1679 Nicholas Tufton, 3rd Earl of Thanet
1679–1680 John Tufton, 4th Earl of Thanet WD RY/BOX 86/21
1680–1684 Richard Tufton, 5th Earl of Thanet
1684–1729 Thomas Tufton, 6th Earl of Thanet
1729–1753 Sackville Tufton, 7th Earl of Thanet
1753–1786 Sackville Tufton, 8th Earl of Thanet DRO/021/102
1786–1825 Sackville Tufton, 9th Earl of Thanet

1800–1899

1900–1974

References 

Public Record Office

 
Westmorland
History of Westmorland